Lali (also Romanized as Lālī; also known as Dasht-e Lālī and Lālī Pelāyen) is a city and capital of Lali County, Khuzestan Province, Iran.  At the 2006 census, its population was 16,213, in 3,041 families.

Climate
Typically of the Khuzestan Plain, Lali has a hot semi-arid climate (Köppen BSh) characterised by brutally hot, rainless summers and comfortable winters with usually cold nights and occasional periods of heavy rainfall.

References

Populated places in Lali County

Cities in Khuzestan Province